Ángel Dario Colla Anacoreto (born 8 September 1973) is an Argentine former professional racing cyclist. He competed at the 1992 Summer Olympics and the 1996 Summer Olympics. In 2010 he was granted the Konex Award Merit Diploma as one of the five best cyclist of the last decade in Argentina.

Career highlights

2000
1st, Stage 2, Doble San Francisco-Miramar
2001
1st, Stage 7 & 9, Vuelta de Chile
2nd, Stage 10, Vuelta de Chile
2002
1st, Stage 2 & 5, Vuelta de Chile
1st, Overall, Clásica del Oeste-Doble Bragado
1st, Stage 3
2003
1st, Prologue, Vuelta a San Juan
1st, Stage 1, 4 & 5B, Clásica del Oeste-Doble Bragado
  in Pan American Games, Track, Team Pursuit, Santo Domingo (DOM)
2004
 National Champion, Road race
2nd, National Championship, Track, Scratch
1st, Stage 4 & 6, Clásica del Oeste-Doble Bragado
1st, Stage 7. Vuelta Ciclista del Uruguay
2005
 Pan American Championships, Track, Scratch
1st, Overall, Doble San Francisco-Miramar
1st, Stage 1 & 2
2006
 World Championship, Track, Scratch
1st, Los Angeles, World Cup Classic, Track, Madison
1st, Prologue, Stage 2 & 5, Giro del Sol
1st, Stage 1, 4 & 5, Clásica del Oeste-Doble Bragado
1st, Stage 2, Doble San Francisco-Miramar
2007
1st, Stage 3, Vuelta a San Juan
1st, Stage 1, Tour de San Luis
1st, Overall, Clásica del Oeste-Doble Bragado
1st, Stage 1, 2 & 6B
1st, Aniversario 3 de Febrero
2008
1st, Stage 3 & 4, Vuelta a San Juan
3rd, Overall, Clásica del Oeste-Doble Bragado
1st, Prologue, Stage 4 & 7

References

External links

1973 births
Living people
Argentine male cyclists
Argentine track cyclists
Cyclists at the 1992 Summer Olympics
Cyclists at the 1996 Summer Olympics
Cyclists at the 2003 Pan American Games
Olympic cyclists of Argentina
Place of birth missing (living people)
Pan American Games medalists in cycling
Pan American Games silver medalists for Argentina
South American Games silver medalists for Argentina
South American Games medalists in cycling
Competitors at the 2010 South American Games
Medalists at the 2003 Pan American Games
20th-century Argentine people
21st-century Argentine people